Morocco is a country in North Africa.  

Morocco may also refer to:
Morocco, Indiana
Morocco, Michigan
Morocco, West Virginia
Morocco (1930 film)
El Morocco, a  famous nightclub in New York City
Morocco leather

See also 
Murukku, a South Indian snack, also popular in Fiji, Malaysia, Singapore and Myanmar
Marocco (also spelled Morocco), a 16th-century performing horse
Don Muraco, former professional wrestler
Rick Morocco, Canadian-Italian ice hockey executive and professional player